Little Beech was an unincorporated community located in Perry County, Kentucky, United States. It was destroyed by strip mining

References

Unincorporated communities in Perry County, Kentucky
Unincorporated communities in Kentucky
Coal towns in Kentucky